Moral policing may refer to:

Moral police in India
Modesty patrol in London
Mishmeret tzniyut in Israel
Islamic religious police in some Muslim-majority countries